Barnes's astrapia, also known as Barnes's long-tailed bird-of-paradise or Barnes's long-tail, is a bird in the family Paradisaeidae and the genus Astrapia that is a likely hybrid between Stephanie's astrapia (A. stephaniae) and the ribbon-tailed astrapia (A. mayeri).

Description
Barnes's astrapia is similar in appearance to both parent species, though closer to a ribbon-tailed astrapia.  Males have two very long white and black tail feathers, glossy blue head and neck, small beak and a black body. Females have fewer blue feathers on their head as well as shorter tails.

Taxonomy
Until 1930, Barnes's astrapia (and all the other hybrid birds-of-paradise) were thought to be species and were named as such. Barnes's astrapia was named Astrarchia barnesi by Iredale in 1948, under the presumption that it is a species.

Distribution
Barnes's astrapia lives in the montane forest of Papua New Guinea, where the ranges of the parent species overlap on a small part of the Hagen Range and Mount Giluwe, usually at 2,300–2,600 m asl.

Notes

References
 
 Peckover, William S. (1990). Papua New Guinea, Birds of Paradise. Brown: Carina.
 International Union for Conservation of Nature Red List of Threatened Species.

External links
 Wildiaries – three photographs of a perched male

Astrapia
Hybrid birds of paradise